= Swolf =

Measure of a swimmer's speed and efficiency

The swolf is a composite measurement in sports swimming that reflects how fast and how efficiently somebody is swimming. In contrast, time per distance (speed) neglects swimming technique, and the number of swimming strokes per lap neglects the purpose of competitive swimming: covering a given distance in the shortest time.

== Background ==
Swolf is a portmanteau of "swim" and "golf". As in golf, a lower number of strokes is better. The swolf score is the number of seconds (for a given lap, 25 or 50 meters), plus the number of swimming strokes made in the same distance.

After a swimmer has learned to swim longer distances at a constant, high power output, it becomes essential to improve the swimming efficiency: achieving a higher acceleration per swimming stroke, and gliding a longer distance between the strokes. The swolf then becomes a useful tool to measure training progress.

Due to different body dimensions, a comparison between two swimmers is rarely useful; the swolf is rather a guide that reflects one's own training progress. In contrast to the earlier days, when swimmers had to count their own strokes, modern sports watches carry acceleration sensors and indicate the swolf number of a given training unit.
